The 93rd Infantry Division (German 93. Infanterie-Division) was a German infantry division that was formed in the fall of 1939. The division fought in the Second World War in both the Battle of France and on the Eastern Front. It was ultimately destroyed by the Red Army in March 1945 while defending East Prussia.

France 
In the spring and early summer of 1940, the division was located near the Maginot Line at Saarbrücken. On 15 June 1940 the division launched its attack south of the city, breaking through the French line and continuing its advance across the Seille and Meurthe rivers, south to the region of the Moselle river. It consolidated between Nancy and Epinal and was ordered to stop on 25 June.

Eastern Front 
After the campaign in France, the division was stationed along the French coast until June 1941, when it was reattached to Army Group North (Heeresgruppe Nord) in preparation for Operation Barbarossa (the invasion of the Soviet Union). The division saw much action during its advance on Leningrad, and then in the subsequent defensive battles against the Soviet winter offensive.

The division fought and held its lines throughout 1942; in August, the 271st Infantry Regiment was given the honorific of "Feldherrnhalle", due to its outstanding performance during the campaigns in France and the Soviet Union.

In the summer of 1943, the division was pulled out of the line and sent to Poland to rest and refit. While there, the 271st Infantry Regiment "Feldherrnhalle" was removed from the division and became the nucleus of the new 60th Panzergrenadier Division "Feldherrnhalle".

The refitted division was once again attached to Army Group North, taking part in desperate attempts to maintain the siege of Leningrad. The division was pushed back with the rest of Army Group North. By late 1944 it was trapped in the Courland Pocket with the now renamed Army Group Courland.

The division was evacuated from Courland at the beginning of 1945 and after a short rest, was sent to Samland, a peninsula on the Baltic coast in Eastern Prussia, where it was destroyed by the Red Army in March.

Organisation 
1939
Infanterie-Regiment 270
Infanterie-Regiment 271
Infanterie-Regiment 272
Artillerie-Regiment 193
Aufklärungs-Abteilung 193
Panzerjäger-Abteilung 193
Pioniere-Abteilung 193
Nachrichten-Abteilung 193

1943
Grenadier-Regiment 270
Grenadier-Regiment 272
Grenadier-Regiment 273
Artillerie-Regiment 193
Fusilier-Abteilung 91

Commanding officers 
General der Pionere Otto Tiemann, 1 September 1939 - 1 May 1943
Generalleutnant Gottfried Weber, 1 May 1943 - 31 May 1943
General der Pionere Otto Tiemann, 31 May 1943 - September 1943
General der Artillerie Horst von Mellenthin, September 1943 - 1 October 1943
Generalleutnant Karl Löwrick, 1 October 1943 - 20 June 1944
Generalleutnant Erich Hofmann, 20 June 1944 - 27 July 1944
Oberst Hermann, 27 July 1944 - 1 September 1944
Generalmajor Kurt Domansky, 1 September 1944 - March 1945

References 
 Die deutschen Infanterie-Divisonen, Band 1-3, by Werner Haupt
 Die deutsche Feldpostübersicht 1939-1945, Band 1-3, by Nobert Kannapin
 Die Pflege der Tradition der alten Armee in Reichsheer und im der Wehrmacht, by Schirmer/Wiener

0*093
Military units and formations established in 1939
Military units and formations disestablished in 1945